The  is a history museum in Ogōri, Fukuoka, Japan. 

The museum first opened in Dazaifu in 1973, but moved to its present location in 2010. The site of the new museum is twice as large as the original location.

Access
The museum is located approximately 10 minutes' walk from Mikunigaoka Station on the Nishitetsu Tenjin Ōmuta Line.

External links
 

History museums in Japan
Kyushu region
Museums in Fukuoka Prefecture
Buildings and structures in Dazaifu, Fukuoka